The A850 road is a road in the Scottish Isles, off the west coast of mainland Scotland.

Road function
It is one of the principal roads of the Isle of Skye in the Inner Hebrides of the Scottish Isles.

Route
It connects Dunvegan Castle and the town of Dunvegan and the north of the island with the A87 road for Portree that then crosses to the mainland road system. The more direct road connecting Dunvegan with the A87 is the A863.

Settlements on or near the A850
West to East
Upperglen
Edinbane
Flashader
Treaslane
Bernisdale
Skeabost
Crepkill
Carbost
Borve

References 

Roads in Scotland
Scenic routes in the United Kingdom
Isle of Skye